Obabikong 35B is a First Nations reserve on Aulneau Island in Lake of the Woods, Ontario. It is one of the reserves of the Big Grassy First Nation.

References

External links
 Canada Lands Survey System

Saulteaux reserves in Ontario
Communities in Kenora District